Pedro Miguel Costa Santos (born 10 February 2003) is a Portuguese professional footballer who plays as a midfielder for Benfica B.

Club career
Santos started his career with Fiães, before joining Benfica in 2016. He signed his first professional contract in March 2019.

International career
Santos has represented Portugal at youth international level.

Career statistics

Club

Notes

Honours
Benfica
Campeonato Nacional de Juniores: 2021–22
 UEFA Youth League: 2021–22

References

2003 births
Living people
Sportspeople from Santa Maria da Feira
Portuguese footballers
Portugal youth international footballers
Association football midfielders
Liga Portugal 2 players
S.L. Benfica footballers
S.L. Benfica B players